Petitcodiac Riverkeeper is a registered non-profit organization and Riverkeeper group based in Moncton, New Brunswick, eastern Canada. The group's mission is to lead the restoration, protection and promotion of the ecological integrity of the Petitcodiac River and Memramcook River−Memramcook area watersheds, and the Shepody Bay estuary, all in southeastern New Brunswick.

References

Environmental organizations based in New Brunswick
Water organizations
Organizations based in Moncton
Environmental organizations established in 1999
1999 establishments in New Brunswick